Allan Jones (born 1951 or 1952) is a British music journalist and editor. Following university, Jones took a job in the stockroom of Hatchards on Piccadilly. While he was there he applied for a writing job at the music weekly Melody Maker with a letter that concluded, "Melody Maker needs a bullet up its arse. I’m the gun – pull the trigger." He joined the staff in 1974 and became editor ten years later. After he wrote a scathing review of Pink Floyd's The Wall show at Earls Court Exhibition Centre he was described on stage by Roger Waters as a "stupid shit". During Jones's tenure as editor Melody Maker provided early publicity for bands ranging from The Stone Roses to Pearl Jam. One of his most significant early decisions was to resist the publisher's instruction to put Kajagoogoo on the cover, choosing instead The Smiths.

In 1997 Jones left Melody Maker to become foud and edit Uncut, a monthly magazine covering music and films. He was still editor as of 2022. Uncut won Consumer Specialist Magazine of the Year and International Consumer Magazine of the Year PPA Awards in 2003, and Consumer Specialist Magazine of the Year in 2004.

Jones was a fan of Jethro Tull and Yes in their early incarnations, but, as he explained in Uncut in 2011, he lost interest in both bands as they embraced the excesses of progressive rock: "It didn't take punk to turn me off bands like Jethro Tull and Yes, who in their earlier incarnations I liked. They did it themselves with the wholly pompous music they started making when they began to take themselves too seriously. That did it for me and it had nothing to do with Year Zero, Johnny Rotten or Sid Vicious."

References

External links
Jones's Blog (UNCUT Magazine)

1950s births
Living people
British music journalists
Melody Maker writers
Welsh journalists